Patricio Sebastián (born March 3, 2003), is a Mexican television actor.

Career 
He began his career at the age of 8 years, in the soap opera El Octavo mandamiento. In 2012 he participated in the telenovela, titled Corona de lágrimas, In that year he began recording the telenovela La Patrona, where it is enshrined as the "Hijo de La Patrona". In 2014 he participated in several soap opera as Dos lunas, Camelia la Texana, El Señor de los Cielos where he played the character of Ernesto Gamboa as a child. In that same year, he joined the cast of the telenovela Señora Acero, where plays the son of the protagonist.

Filmography

References

External links 

21st-century Mexican male actors
2003 births
Living people
Mexican male child actors
Mexican male telenovela actors
Male actors from Mexico City